Pırpır is a village in the Çilimli District of Düzce Province in Turkey. Its population is 1,384 (2022).

References

Villages in Çilimli District